The Canadian province of Quebec held school board elections on December 9, 1985, to elect new trustees to Catholic and Protestant school boards. Many candidates were elected without opposition, and turnout was generally low.

Outside of the island of Montreal, one-third of all trustees were elected each year on a rotating basis.

South Shore

Turnout on the south shore of Montreal was especially low, with estimates ranging from between three and ten per cent.

Commission scolaire Jacques-Cartier

Notes
Source: Sandy Senyk, "School board elections drew low voter turnout," Montreal Gazette, 11 December 1985, A5.

Quebec school board elections
School board elections
Quebec school board elections
School trustee elections in Quebec